Acclaim Entertainment, Inc. was an American video game publisher based in Glen Cove, New York. Originally formed by Greg Fischbach, Robert Holmes and Jim Scoroposki out of an Oyster Bay storefront in 1987, the company established a worldwide development team through a series of acquisitions in the late 1990s and early 2000s. After poor financial returns in their 2003 fiscal year, Acclaim filed for Chapter 7 bankruptcy in September 2004. Properties owned by Acclaim were subsequently auctioned off to various parties.

History 
In the early 1980s, Greg Fischbach was employed by American video game company Activision, where he worked together with Robert Holmes and Jim Scoroposki. He left Activision to join RCA Records, which was subsequently acquired by Bertelsmann and Fischbach found himself unemployed. In 1987, he met with Scoroposki in Oyster Bay, where Scoroposki owned a sales rep company, to discuss a possible shared venture. After Scoroposki suggested that the two should re-enter the video game business, they contacted Holmes to join them, and the three jointly founded Acclaim Entertainment. In its initial years, Acclaim was exclusively a video game publisher, either farming out the creation of its video games to external developers or localizing existing video games from overseas. But as it grew, it purchased some independent studios, including Iguana Entertainment of Austin, Texas; Probe Entertainment of London, England; and Sculptured Software of Salt Lake City, Utah.

The name of the company was picked because it had to be alphabetically above the co-founder's former place of employment, Activision, and also had to be alphabetically above Accolade (another company formed by ex-Activision employees). This was a common formula for picking names of new companies that were founded by ex-Activision employees (the founders of Activision used this formula when they left Atari).

Many of Acclaim's products used licenses from popular comics, television series and movies. They were also responsible for the ports of many of Midway's arcade games in the early to mid-1990s, including the Mortal Kombat series. They also published some games from other companies that at the time of publication did not have an American branch, such as Technōs Japan's Double Dragon II: The Revenge and Taito's Bust-a-Move series.

In 1990, Acclaim partnered with TV producer Saban Entertainment and distributor Bohbot Entertainment to launch Video Power, which subsequently went on air in the fall of 1990.

In May 1994, former Sega Enterprises USA president Tom Petit, who had worked at Sega for nine years, became the president of Acclaim's coin-op division.

Through much of the 1990s Acclaim were one of the most successful publishers of console video games in the world. In the financial year ending August 1994 they saw a profit of $481 million, and this figure rose to $585 million the following year.

In 1995, the company acquired Sculptured Software, Iguana Entertainment and Probe Entertainment and the companies switched to the first-party development studio, known as Acclaim Studios from 1999 to 2004. Acclaim's gaming business was further expanded with the purchase of exclusive rights to publish Taito's games in the Western Hemisphere. The company also had a motion capture studio built into their headquarters, making them the first video game company to have an in-house motion capture studio.

A less significant aspect of Acclaim's business was the development and publication of strategy guides relating to their software products and the issuance of "special edition" comic magazines, via Acclaim Comics, to support the more lucrative brand names. Lastly, they created the ASF/AMC motion capture format which is still in use in the industry today.

Acclaim enjoyed a long relationship with the World Wrestling Federation (now known as WWE) dating back to 1988's WWF WrestleMania. However, after failing to match the success of World Championship Wrestling's THQ/AKI games amidst the Monday Night Wars, the WWF unexpectedly defected to THQ in 1999. Acclaim then picked up the license to Extreme Championship Wrestling and released two games for the company. ECW declared bankruptcy in 2001 while still owing Acclaim money. The game publisher would release three wrestling titles under the Legends of Wrestling banner in the throes of its final years.

Acclaim suffered financial problems in 2004, the result of poor sales of its video game titles. This resulted in the closure of Acclaim Studios Cheltenham and Acclaim Studios Manchester in England and other places and their filing for Chapter 11 bankruptcy protection, leaving many employees unpaid. Amongst the titles under development at the UK studios were Emergency Mayhem, ATV Quad Power Racing 3, The Last Job, Interview with a Made Man and Kung Faux.

When Acclaim's agreement with GMAC Commercial Finance, their primary lender, expired on August 20, 2004, the company closed all of its facilities on August 27, of which the Austin and New York studios saw all employees let go. Prior to the closures, as of March 31, 2004, Acclaim employed 585 staff worldwide. Acclaim announced on August 30 that they were to go bankrupt, and filed for Chapter 7 bankruptcy with the United States bankruptcy court in Central Islip, New York on September 1. A September 2005 complaint filed with the same court found founders Fischbach and Scorposki, as well as executives Rodney Cousens, Gerard F. Agoglia, Edmond P. Sanctis, Bernard Fischbach, James Scibelli, Robert H. Groman and Michael Tannen, accountable for the financial losses of Acclaim shortly before the bankruptcy filing, seeking  in damages.

An attempt to reopen the Cheltenham and Manchester studios in October 2004 (under the new name Exclaim) failed due to legal wrangling over intellectual property, with both the US and UK administrators claiming rights.

In August 2005, former Activision executive Howard Marks purchased the name "Acclaim" for a reported $100,000. In the beginning of 2006, Marks formed a new company called Acclaim Games. According to a job listing for the company, Acclaim Games was aimed at the US and UK preteen multiplayer markets. However, the second iteration of Acclaim did not go well due to connectivity and payment issues for their online games, along with a lack of action against dishonest players, earning that iteration of the company an "F" grade from the Los Angeles/Southern California Better Business Bureau.

Asset selling 
In 2005, Acclaim's former IPs were put up for sale and were sold in auction. The Dave Mirra Freestyle BMX and ATV: Quad Power Racing series were purchased by Crave Entertainment. Juiced was purchased by THQ, Emergency Mayhem was purchased by Codemasters, Interview with a Made Man was purchased by former employees of Acclaim Studios Manchester and The Red Star was purchased by budget publisher XS Games.

In 2006, Throwback Entertainment purchased more than 50 of Acclaim's games, and vowed to bring such titles as Re-Volt, Extreme-G, Gladiator: Sword of Vengeance, Vexx, Fur Fighters and many other franchises into the next generation and beyond. Acclaim's headquarters were sold to Anthony Pistilli of Pistilli Realty Group for $6 million in November 2004.

In July 2010, South Korean based company We Go Interactive purchased Re-Volt, RC Revenge, and RC De Go! (developed and owned by Taito) from Throwback.

In May 2016, the Acclaim brand itself, and not any of the IP previously held by Acclaim, was acquired by Collectorvision, an independent game developer, publisher and manufacturer.

In October 2018, Liquid Media Group purchased 65 ex-Acclaim titles from Throwback for $1 million. This mainly consisted of installments in the NBA Jam, AFL Live, All-Star Baseball and NFL Quarterback Club franchises, as well as some Taito titles that Acclaim published outside of Japan.

Controversies 
During Acclaim's decline towards bankruptcy, the company made several controversial business and marketing decisions in the United Kingdom. One example was a promise that a US$10,000 (£6000) prize would be awarded to UK parents who would name their baby "Turok", to promote the release of Turok: Evolution. A later investigation by VG247 found that all those who had reportedly changed their names were actors. Another was an attempt to buy advertising space on actual tombstones for Shadow Man: 2econd Coming.

To promote Burnout 2: Point of Impact, Acclaim offered to reimburse any driver in the United Kingdom who received a speeding ticket. Following a negative reaction to this from the UK government, the plan was cancelled. In the US, Acclaim suffered multiple lawsuits, a portion of them with former partners. Mary-Kate and Ashley Olsen sued over unpaid royalties.

In the last iteration of the BMX series, BMX XXX, nudity and semi-nudity (e.g., full motion video of strippers and nude female riders) was added in hopes of boosting sales. However, like most of Acclaim's video games during its final years, BMX XXX sold poorly, and was derided for its sexual content and poor gameplay. Dave Mirra himself publicly disowned the game, stating that he was not involved in the decision to include nudity, and he sued Acclaim for fear of being associated with BMX XXX.

Another lawsuit was from Acclaim's own investors, claiming that Acclaim management had published misleading financial reports.

In 1997, two years after its acquisition of Sculptured Software, during which it offered employees what looked like iron-clad contracts and stock that would be vested over the course of the contracts, Acclaim terminated about half of the staff of the Salt Lake City studio, violating its own contract terms. The lay-off came abruptly to the point that the employees had to choose between taking a reasonable severance package (whose terms altered several times during the initial weeks after the layoff) and not suing, or join the other creditors and sue, but lose their severance packages. In 2007, one of numerous class action suits filed on behalf of stockholders was won, allowing some of the employees to realize a return on some of the stock that had been vested.

Subsidiaries

Games published

References

External links 
  (archived)

1987 establishments in New York (state)
2004 disestablishments in New York (state)
Companies based in Nassau County, New York
Companies that have filed for Chapter 7 bankruptcy
Companies that filed for Chapter 11 bankruptcy in 2004
Defunct companies based in New York (state)
Defunct video game companies of the United States
Golden Joystick Award winners
Video game companies established in 1987
Video game companies disestablished in 2004
Video game publishers